Salem is a Compact Rural Community and unincorporated place in the municipality of South Frontenac, Frontenac County in southern Ontario, Canada. The community is in geographic Bedford Township, and lies on the county border with the municipality of Rideau Lakes, United Counties of Leeds and Grenville.

References

Communities in Frontenac County